This is a list of massacres in Ukraine.

Other events 
These events involving multiple deaths in Ukraine are not widely known, or recognised, as 'massacres'.

See also
Holodomor

References 

Massacres
Ukraine
 
Ukraine history-related lists